René Schneider (born 1 February 1973) is a German former professional footballer who played as a defender.

Club career
Schneider played mostly for Hansa Rostock. During his time at Borussia Dortmund he gained a Champions League medal in 1997, making one appearance en route to the final. This came against Auxerre in the quarterfinal first leg, a game in which he also scored. He was, however, left off of the squad for the final altogether.

International career
At international level, Schneider played one match for Germany national team in 1995 against South Africa and was a unused squad member of the team that won the 1996 UEFA European Championship.

References

External links
 
 
 

1973 births
Living people
German footballers
East German footballers
Association football defenders
Germany international footballers
Germany under-21 international footballers
UEFA Euro 1996 players
UEFA European Championship-winning players
Borussia Dortmund players
FC Hansa Rostock players
1. FC Magdeburg players
Hamburger SV players
VfL Osnabrück players
Bundesliga players
DDR-Oberliga players
Sportspeople from Schwerin
Footballers from Mecklenburg-Western Pomerania
People from Bezirk Schwerin